HMS Aldborough was a 24-gun sixth-rate ship of the Royal Navy, purchased in 1706 and in service in Mediterranean and English waters until 1727 when she was rebuilt as a 374 ton (builder's measure) sixth rate in accordance with the 1719 Establishment for Sixth Rates. After the rebuild she spent her career in the West Indies, Home Waters and the Mediterranean. She was finally broken at Deptford on 31 March 1742.

Aldborough was the second named vessel since it was used for a 10=gun ketch. launched by Johnson of Aldeburgh on 6 May 1691 and accidentally blown up on 17 August 1698.

Specifications and Construction
Initially intended for merchant service, the as yet unnamed vessel was purchased for Naval use while still under construction at London's Blackwall Yard on 2 January 1706. She was registered as a naval vessel on 26 February. She was launched on 6 March 1706. Her builder's Measure tonnage was 28777/94 tons. She carried a standardize armament of twenty 6-pounders on the upper deck (UD) and four 4-pounders on the quarterdeck. She was a full rigged ship.

Commissioned Service

She was commissioned as Aldborough in March 1706 under the command of Commander Beaumont Waldron, RN. Initially she was recorded as being off Ostend, then assigned as part of the British presence in the Mediterranean in 1707. In 1708 she was in the English Channel escorting convoys. On 11 April 1708 she engaged and captured the French privateer Le Postillon. In December 1709 she was under Captain Thomas Ekines, RN. On 28 April 1710 she captured another privateer, La Genevieve de Bonne Esperance. On 28 August 1711 she ran down and seized a third French ship, Le Desmarais. In 1711 she was at Glasgow, Scotland. Despite Aldboroughs victories, Ekines was dismissed as her captain in June 1712, and replaced by Captain Joseph Thornton for service in the Mediterranean in 1713.

Eight years of active service had reduced Aldboroughs seaworthiness, and in 1714 she underwent an expensive refit and repair at Portsmouth Dockyard at a cost of 1,268.8.41/2d. She returned to sea in 1715 under Captain Charles Stewart, RN, whose orders were to patrol the waters surrounding Scotland and Ireland. A further refit was required at Plymouth dockyard in the summer of 1717 at a cost of 1,304.10.71/4d, after which Aldborough returned to her previous coastal patrol. In 1719 she was under command of Captain Thomas Lawrence, RN.

Rebuild at Portsmouth 1727
She was docked at Portsmouth for dismantling in preparation to rebuild on 29 March 1727 as a 374 ton (builder's measure) 20 gun sixth rate under the guidance of the Portsmouth Master Shipwright, Joseph Allin. Her keel was considered laid when she was placed in the dock and dismantling was commenced. She was ordered to be rebuilt on 12 April then again on 27 April 1727. She was relaunched on 21 October 1727. Her builder's Measure tonnage was 37490/94 tons. She carried a standardize armament of twenty 6-pounders on the upper deck (UD). She was a full rigged ship. She was completed for sea on 12 March 1728 at a cost of 4,657.13.2d for building and 2,804.12.10d for fitting.

Commissioned Service after Rebuild
Aldborough was commissioned in March 1728 under the command of Captain Edward Barker, RN for survey work in the West Indies. In early 1729  he was replaced by Captain John Gascoigne, RN. After about six years in the West Indies the ship returned to Deptford Dockyard to pay off in July 1734 for refit and repair. After years in tropical waters had taken their toll with extensive work required to restore her hull and timbers. Refitting continued until June 1735 at a cost of £5,417 for fitting.

She was commissioned in May 1735 under the command of Captain Nicholas Robinson, RN for service in the English Channel and North Sea. She was paid off in 1736 for a small repair at Sheerness at a cost of 259.18.2d for fitting. Her repair was complete in January 1737. By Admiralty Order 16 August 1737 she was converted to a fireship with 8 guns manned by 55 men at a cost of 1,546.0.1d for fitting. The conversion was carried out at Deptford between August and December 1737. However, In early 1738 she was ordered to be converted back into a 20-gun sixth rate ship. She was commissioned in August 1738 under the command of Captain George Pocock, RN for service in the Mediterranean. She was immediately deployed as a privateer hunter, capturing a Spanish barque on 28 January 1739 and taking part in the capture of two more vessels in June. She was less successful in 1740, cruising for several weeks off the coast of Malta without encountering enemy craft. In January 1741 she was part of the British fleet at Port Mahon off the coast of Spain.

Disposition
She was broken at Deptford on 31 March 1742.

Notes

Citations

References
 Winfield 2009, British Warships in the Age of Sail (1603 – 1714), by Rif Winfield, published by Seaforth Publishing, England © 2009, EPUB , Chapter 6, The Sixth Rates, Vessels acquired from 2 May 1660, Purchased Vessels (1706), Aldborough
 Winfield 2007, British Warships in the Age of Sail (1714 – 1792), by Rif Winfield, published by Seaforth Publishing, England © 2007, EPUB , Chapter 6, Sixth Rates, Sixth Rates of 20 or 24 guns, Vessels in Service at 1 August 1714, Purchased Vessels (1706), Aldborough
 Colledge, Ships of the Royal Navy, by J.J. Colledge, revised and updated by Lt Cdr Ben Warlow and Steve Bush, published by Seaforth Publishing, Barnsley, Great Britain, © 2020, EPUB , Section A (Aldborough)

Corvettes of the Royal Navy
Ships of the Royal Navy
1700s ships